100% Maná    is a 2001 four CD boxset compilation album by Latin American Mexican rock band Maná. This compilation was produced with the objective of entering the Spain and European markets. Includes 47 songs with hits like "Rayando El Sol", "Oye Mi Amor", "¿Donde Jugaran Los Niños?", "No Ha Parado De Llover", and "Como Te Extraño Corazón".

Track listing

Disc 1 (Falta Amor)

Disc 2 (¿Dónde Jugarán Los Niños?)

Disc 3 (Cuando los Ángeles Lloran)

Disc 4 (Sueños Líquidos)

Certifications

References

Maná compilation albums
2001 compilation albums
Spanish-language compilation albums
Warner Music Group compilation albums